Metopus palaeformides is a species of metopid first found in soil from the Murray River floodplain, Australia. It closely resembles Heterometopus palaeformis, but can be distinguished from its cogenerate species by the size of its body, number of adoral polykinetids and its oral area pattern.

References

Intramacronucleata
Protists described in 2016